There are about 52 known species of New World monkeys in Peru, particularly in the Peruvian Amazon. Among these are species of marmoset, woolly monkey, and others.

See also
List of mammals of Peru

References

Monkeys
New World monkeys